Angela Grauerholz D.F.A. (born January 10, 1952) is a German-born Canadian photographer, graphic designer and educator living in Montreal.

Biography
Grauerholz was born in Hamburg and completed studies in graphic design at the Kunstschule Alsterdamm there and studied literature and linguistics at the University of Hamburg. She came to Canada in 1976 and, with the help of a grant from the Canada Council, completed a MFA degree in photography at Concordia University. During the 1980s, she operated a graphic design studio, working on magazines, catalogues and books. In 1988, she began teaching graphic design at the Université du Québec à Montréal; in 2008, she became director of the Centre of Design there.

She was one of the founders of the Artexte Information Centre in 1980. She has digitized much of her own work as well as her personal archive of images from newspapers and other sources. She is represented by galleries in Montreal, Toronto, Berlin and Paris and has held solo shows at the Musée du Québec and the Museum of Contemporary Photography in Chicago.

Her photographic work is distinguished by a hazy quality produced using long exposures and overlapping images. Her images of commonplace subjects take on a feeling of timelessness. Grauerholz continued to experiment, later incorporating the use of multiple images and sculpture into her installations. She has exhibited her work at Canadian and international exhibitions such as La Biennale de Montreal in 2002, the Biennale of Sydney in 1990, Documenta 9 in Kassel in 1992 and the Carnegie International in Pittsburgh in 1995. The Canadian Museum of Contemporary Photography presented a retrospective of her work in 2010.

Grauerholz has received numerous awards for her work, including the Award of Excellence from the American Federation of Arts, the Prix Paul-Émile-Borduas the Governor General's Award in Visual and Media Arts and received an honorary doctorate from Emily Carr University in 2018.

Her work is included in the collections of the Stedelijk Museum Amsterdam, the Art Gallery of Ontario, the Montreal Museum of Fine Arts, the National Gallery of Canada, the Musée d'art contemporain de Montréal and the Vancouver Art Gallery.

Exhibitions 

 2019: The Empty S(h)elf, Artexte, Montreal
 2019: Chennai Photo Biennale, Chennai
 2016: Scotiabank Photography Award, Ryerson Image Centre, Toronto
 2014: Olga Korper Gallery, Toronto
 2012: Art 45, Montreal
 2011: Olga Korper Gallery, Toronto
 2011: Angela Grauerholz: the inexhaustible image...épuiser l'image, University of Toronto Art Center (UTAC), Toronto
 2010: Angela Grauerholz: the inexhaustible image...épuiser l'image, National Gallery of Canada/Canadian Museum of Contemporary Photography (CMCP), Ottawa
 2010: McMaster Museum of Art, McMaster University, Hamilton
 2009: www.atworkandplay.ca, VOX, centre de l'image contemporaine, Montréal
 2008: Reading Room for the Working Artist, Vancouver Public Library, Vancouver, part of the exhibition Memory Palace (3 artists in the library) held between 2008 and 2009
 2008: Ladder of Ascent and Descent, part of Aperture Banners, Vancouver Public Library, Vancouver
 2008: Art 45, Montreal
 2008: Olga Korper Gallery, Toronto
 2006: Reading Room for the Working Artist, VOX, centre de l'image contemporaine, Montreal
 2004: Reading Room for the Working Artist, Olga Korper Gallery, Toronto
 2003: Reading Room for the Working Artist + Privation, Blaffer Galley, The Art Museum of the University of Houston, Houston
 2002: Privation, Contemporary Art Gallery, Vancouver
 2001: Privation, Olga Korper Gallery, Toronto
 1999: Sentencia I - LXII, Albright-Knox Art Gallery, Buffalo Dorsky Gallery Curatorial Programs, New York
 1999: Sentencia I - LXII, The Power Plant Art Gallery, Toronto
 1999: Sentencia I - LXII, Galerie Reckermann, Cologne
 1999: Olga Korper Gallery, Toronto
 1995: Angela Grauerholz, curator: Paulette Gagnon, Musée d'art contemporain de Montréal
 1992: documenta 9, Kassel

Collections 

 Stedelijk Museum, Amsterdam
 DG Bank, Frankfurt
 Collection Bunderstag, Berlin
 Museum of Fine Arts, Dole
 Musée de Tourcoing, Tourcoing
 FNAC (Fonds national d'art contemporain), France
 FRAC (Fonds régional d'art contemporain), France
 Carnegie Museum of Art, Pittsburgh
 Modern Art Museum of Fort Worth, Fort Worth
 The Museum of Fine Arts, Houston
 Albright-Knox Art Gallery, Buffalo, New York
 Musée d'art contemporain de Montréal, Montreal
 Musée des Beaux-Arts de Montréal, Montreal
 Musée national des beaux-arts du Québec, Québec
 Rare Books Library, McGill University, Montréal
 National Gallery of Canada, Ottawa
 Department of External Affairs, Ottawa
 Art Gallery of Ontario, Toronto
 Art Gallery of Windsor, Windsor
 McMaster Museum of Art (McMaster University), Hamilton
 Oakville Galleries, Oakville
 Mendel Art Gallery, Saskatoon
 Norman Mackenzie Art Gallery, Regina
 Vancouver Art Gallery, Vancouver

Awards 
Governor General's Award in Visual and Media Arts (2014)

References

External links 
 Official site
 

1952 births
Living people
Canadian women photographers
Canadian graphic designers
Governor General's Award in Visual and Media Arts winners
University of Hamburg alumni
Concordia University alumni
Academic staff of the Université du Québec à Montréal
Women graphic designers